Mohamed al-Refai is an Egyptian critic, novelist and writer. Since 1980, he has been writing for the Egyptian magazine Sabah al-Khair. He has also written a number of books, radio plays, television series, and film scripts. Al-Refai's novel Nocturnal Creatures of Sadness was nominated for the Arabic Booker Prize in 2012.

Al-Refai lives and works in Cairo.

Selected works

Books
 Palestine in Egyptian Theatre
 Experiments in Arab Theatre

Radio plays
 A Journey in Olden Times
 Paradise Lost
 Papers of the Barada River

TV series
 The Overcoat (based on Nikolai Gogol's short story) 
 The White (based on a novel by Yusef Idriss) 
 The Extoller of the Moon (based on the life of the Egyptian composer Baligh Hamdi)

Film scripts
 The Case of Mr. Mungid 
 Stolen Dreams

References

Egyptian novelists
Egyptian critics
Egyptian journalists
Egyptian dramatists and playwrights
Living people
Year of birth missing (living people)